Japantown/Ayer station is a light rail station operated by Santa Clara Valley Transportation Authority.  The station is located in San Jose, California on 1st Street just north of Empire Street. This station is served by the Blue and Green lines of the VTA Light Rail system.

Nearby points of interest 
Japantown – Historic neighborhood, with business district along Jackson Street

References

External links 

Transit Unlimited

Santa Clara Valley Transportation Authority light rail stations
Santa Clara Valley Transportation Authority bus stations
Railway stations in San Jose, California
1987 establishments in California
Railway stations in the United States opened in 1987